Jordan David Murray (born 2 October 1995) is an Australian professional footballer who plays as a striker for Nakhon Ratchasima in Thai League 1.

Career

South Coast Wolves
Murray started his career at South Coast Wolves, a semi-professional club that competes in the National Premier League (NPL). He made a total of 38 appearances there and scored 10 goals.

APIA Leichhardt 
In 2016, he was signed by APIA Leichhardt which also competes in the NPL. Out of his 61 appearances for the club, he scored 43 goals and also won the golden boot during the 2018 NSW season.

Central Coast Mariners
In 2018, he signed his first professional contract with Central Coast Mariners. He made his debut for the Mariners as a second-half substitute in a 1–1 draw with the Brisbane Roar in Round 1 of the 2018–19 season. Murray scored his first A-League goal with a strike in a 4–1 loss to Perth Glory at Central Coast Stadium. On 17 April 2019, after 21 appearances in the A-League, Murray signed a new two-year deal with the Mariners. In October 2020, the club officially stated that they have parted ways with Murray on mutual terms. Later it was revealed that he has agreed in terms with an Indian Super League club.

Kerala Blasters
On 24 October 2020, Murray signed for the Indian Super League club Kerala Blasters ahead of the 2020-21 ISL season.  He made his debut for the Blasters on 20 November against ATK Mohun Bagan, coming on as a substitute in the 75th minute. On 13 December 2020, Murray scored on his first start for the club in the South Indian Derby against Bengaluru. Murray scored his next his goal against Hyderabad on 27 December 2020 which ended 2-0 in favour of the Blasters. He was also able to score one goal in a 4-2 loss against Odisha on 7 January 2021. On 10 January, Murray's brace helped Blasters to win against Jamshedpur 3-2 and was awarded the man of the match award. Murray scored in the 1-1 draw against East Bengal on 15 January 2021, thus scoring in three consecutive matches during the season. and was the top scorer for the club in the season. On 11 June 2021, the club officially announced the departure of Murray.

Jamshedpur
On 5 September 2021, Jamshedpur announced that they had signed a two-year deal with Murray, ahead of the 2021–22 Indian Super League season.

Nakhon Ratchasima
On August 4, 2022, Murray moved to Thailand, signing with Nakhon Ratchasima.

Career statistics

Honours 
APIA Leichhardt
 National Premier Leagues NSW; Premiership: 2017
 National Premier Leagues NSW; runner-up: 2017, 2018  
 Waratah Cup: 2018 
 Waratah Cup; runner-up: 2017

Jamshedpur
Indian Super League; League Winners Shield: 2021–22

Individual
National Premier Leagues NSW: 2018 Golden Boot
Indian Super League Golden boot for Kerala Blasters.

References

External links
Jordan Murray at Indian Super League

1995 births
Living people
Australian soccer players
Association football forwards
Central Coast Mariners FC players
National Premier Leagues players
A-League Men players
Kerala Blasters FC players
Jordan Murray
Jordan Murray
Expatriate footballers in India
Australian expatriate sportspeople in India
Indian Super League players
Australian expatriate sportspeople in Thailand
Jamshedpur FC players